The Ethiopian bee-eater (Merops  lafresnayii) is a species of bird in the family Meropidae.
It is found in Ethiopia and Sudan. It was formerly considered a subspecies of the blue-breasted bee-eater.

The Ethiopian bee-eater is a rainforest bird usually found singly. It perches on a high branch in the canopy beside tracks and clearings and swoops down on small butterflies, honeybees and other insects before returning to its original perch.

References

Ethiopian bee-eater
Birds of West Africa
Ethiopian bee-eater